This is the list of the Lebanese government that was formed by Fouad Siniora on 19 July 2005 after the general elections of 2005, who was appointed by then president Émile Lahoud. All the main political blocs were included in it except for the Free Patriotic Movement-led bloc headed by General Michel Aoun. Hezbollah were firstly represented in this cabinet.

The legality of the government was questioned when five Shia members left in November 2006. The reason for their resignation was Siniora's eagerness to sign the UN draft plan for the foundation of the Special Tribunal for Lebanon, which would search the assassination of Rafik Hariri, who was killed on 14 February 2005.

On 24 November 2007, the government became an interim one following the end of the president's mandate. A new government shall be formed following the election of a new president.

Composition

Notes

References

2005 establishments in Lebanon
2008 disestablishments in Lebanon
Cabinets of Lebanon
Cabinets established in 2005
Cabinets disestablished in 2008